is a 1968 neoclassical drama written and produced by Japanese writer Yukio Mishima. Published in book form on October 13, 1968, the play was first produced on stage the following year and ran January 18–31, 1969. In one of these productions, Mishima himself played Adolf Hitler.

Inspiration 
Mishima was inspired by the assassination of Ernst Röhm in the Night of the Long Knives, and was intrigued by Hitler. However, more of his influence for Hitler's character came from one of his other plays . Since Mishima's other play Sado Koshaku fujin (Madame de Sade) stars an all-female cast, he wanted My Friend Hitler to be an all-male cast. According to Mishima himself he wanted to refute criticism claiming that he could not portray both genders.

About the play 
The four characters are Adolf Hitler, Gustav Krupp, Gregor Strasser and Ernst Röhm (from whose text the play's title is taken). The play takes place over the summer of 1934 at the Berlin chancellery. The reviews and critiques of the play vary, as some call it anti-fascist while others claim that it preaches fascism.

The "madness disguised as sanity" that "even among the most calm and sane human beings, there is more ruthlessness than the madmen" was one of the themes of his work, whereby Mishima meant to convey that history was the most inhuman product of humanity: "You want to turn Hitler into an 'other' who has nothing to do with you and settle down in humanism, but Hitler lives in you. You, too, may be "Hitler's friend" yourself."

In his Memorandum on Marquis de Sade and My Friend Hitler, Mishima made clear his personal opinion on Hitler:

Hitler was a political genius, but not a hero. He was completely lacking in the freshness and radiance needed for a hero. Hitler is as dark as the twentieth century itself.

Plot 
The play begins with Hitler giving a speech to the people of Germany, during which his two friends Krupp and Röhm come in to watch the speech. They talk to each other and discuss the "iron bouquet" Krupp metaphorically used to set into motion great advancements in human history, including shaping Hitler into a better leader.

Later in the play, Strasser enters the scene. He has a bad relationship with Röhm. Krupp describes their relationship as that of a "cat and dog". Strasser then argues that the war profits need to be returned to the country. Röhm gets mad, calling him a socialist. After the speech is finished, Hitler returns to the group awaiting him and gets their reports about the peoples' reaction to the speech, all of them telling him it was outstanding, even calling Hitler an artist.

Hitler then talks to Röhm alone about how they were so close to each other, but now that he is so busy running the country and doesn't have the time anymore to talk about the "good old days" with one of his trusted friends. Hitler then decides to get away from his political life for the day. And so Röhm decides to train Hitler on everything he needs to know about being a military leader.

References

1968 plays
Cultural depictions of Adolf Hitler
Plays by Yukio Mishima